Piaggio Aerospace, formerly Piaggio Aero Industries, is a multinational aerospace manufacturing company headquartered in Villanova d'Albenga, Italy. The company designs, develops, manufactures and maintains aircraft, aero-engines, aerospace components and aerostructures.

Established in 1884 as Rinaldo Piaggio S.p.A., it shares its ancestry with motor vehicle manufacturer Piaggio and is one of the world's oldest aircraft manufacturers, having produced its first aircraft during 1915. The company's facilities were rebuilt following the Second World War and several original designs, including the P.136 seaplane, the P.149 trainer aircraft, and the P.166 utility transport, were released during the first two decades of the postwar era. During the 1960s, Piaggio began manufacturing jet engines as well. During 1966, the business was separated into the aviation-focused Piaggio Aero and the motor scooter manufacturer Vespa.

During the 1980s, Piaggio developed a new generation business aircraft, the P.180 Avanti. During the late 1990s, Piaggio underwent drastic changes following its bankruptcy. The company was negatively impacted by the Great Recession and the downturn in the business aircraft market. During late 2018, the company entered into receivership after having declared itself insolvent. The firm owns a subsidiary in the United States, Piaggio America, located at West Palm Beach, Florida.

History

The Rinaldo Piaggio S.p.A. company was founded in Genoa, Italy in 1884. Originally, the company was involved in the outfitting of ocean liners and the manufacturing of rolling stock for the developing Italian railway infrastructure around the turn of the century. From the financial gains that it had garnered from these industries, Rinaldo Piaggio was able to construct a large factory based in Final Marina during 1906. In 1915, during the opening years of the First World War, the company produced its first Piaggio-branded aircraft.

The 1920s was a particularly turbulent and influential period in the company's history; Piaggio Aero brought on two new aeronautical engineers, Giovanni Pegna and Giuseppe Gabrielli, who both played a major role in developing Piaggio's aeronautical sector. Penga and Gabrielli worked together to create numerous technical solutions to aviation problems; to support their aerodynamic research, in 1928, Piaggio completed a new wind tunnel. The firm eventually helped to bring forth the design and construction of the world's first helicopter.

During 1938, Senator Rinaldo Piaggio died at 71 years old, thus ending the Rinaldo Piaggio era. That same year, the firm finished construction of the new Piaggio P.108 heavy bomber, its first four-engined aircraft. During the battles and widespread devastation of the Second World War, Piaggio's facilities were reduced to ruins. Rinaldo's sons Enrico, inventor of the Vespa motor scooter, and Armando, played key roles in the postwar rebuilding process.

In 1948, Piaggio launched the Piaggio P.136, a twin-engine seaplane that was operated by the Italian Air Force and various other operators, often in liaison/sea transport capacity. The company also benefited from an increased demand for basic aircraft training; during 1953, the German Air Force ordered 265 Piaggio P.149 trainers. By 1957, Piaggio had also developed the Piaggio P.166, a twin-engine light transport aircraft, which was marketed and produced for military customers and civilian personnel worldwide.

In 1960, Piaggio secured a production license for the Rolls-Royce Viper turbojet engine; shortly thereafter, the firm began manufacturing jet engines. Four years later, it built its first jet-powered aircraft, the Piaggio PD.808 business aircraft. The 1960s was a decade of considerable expansion for Piaggio, moving beyond its core business focus. During 1966, the company formally separated into two separate entities, one being the aviation-focused Piaggio Aero and the other becoming Vespa, a specialist company in the production of motor scooters.

During the 1980s, Piaggio developed a new generation business aircraft, the P.180 Avanti; its unconventional appearance was reportedly designed to appeal to Fortune 500 clients. During 1990, the Avanti received type certification from multiple aviation authorities and entered service shortly thereafter.

During the late 1990s, Piaggio's ownership went through multiple drastic changes following the firm's bankruptcy. During November 1998, it was announced that Turkish holding company Tushav  had taken control of Piaggio; it was rebranded as Piaggio Aero Industries shortly thereafter. In the years that followed, an increasingly large stake in the company was acquired by a group of entrepreneurs headed by the Di Mase and Ferrari families. During 2000, Tushav decided to surrender its interest in Piaggio Aero Industries; the entity had once held a controlling 51% stake in the company, but this hold had reduced in favour of new Italian investors buying into Piaggio.

Starting in 2006, Piaggio was developing a new twin-engined jet, commonly referred to as the Piaggio P1XX; however, during August 2010, the company announced that it had decided to postpone the production phase. This did not represent an absolute termination; for years following the project being put on hold, Piaggio publicly speculated on the possible launch of the programme.

During 2006, the Mubadala Development Company acquired a 35% stake in Piaggio Aero Industries S.p.A.; Mubadala is a wholly owned investment vehicle of the Government of the Emirate of Abu Dhabi, in the United Arab Emirates. Two years later, the Indian multinational conglomerate Tata Group acquired a one-third stake in Piaggio Aero Industries, becoming one of the primary shareholders alongside Piero Ferrari, the Di Mase family and the Mubadala Development Company. As part of the acquisition, Tata gained the right to appoint three of the nine seats on the board, and one of the three seats on the management committee.

The company was negatively impacted by the Great Recession, the event having caused a downturn in the market for business aircraft; reportedly, deliveries of its P.180 Avanti declined drastically from 30 aircraft during 2008 to only four per year by 2018. Instead of focusing on this declining market, Piaggio decided to orientate itself towards the special missions sector, developing the Piaggio-Selex P.1HH Hammerhead, an unmanned long-endurance intelligence, surveillance and reconnaissance derivative of its P.180 Avanti. The platform was also adapted into a maritime patrol aircraft, as well as for additional special purposes, around this same timeframe. In parallel with these programmes, the company continued to make improvements to the base P.180 Avanti, introducing an extended-range model during 2013.

During 2013, Mubadala and Tata injecting an additional €190 million into Piaggio Aero Industries, increasing their combined stakes to 85.5%. During October 2014, Piaggio Aero changed its name to Piaggio Aerospace. During 2015, the Mubadla Development Company acquired 100% of the capital stock, assuming full control of Piaggio, after obtaining the final 1.95% of the stock from Piero Ferrari.

On 3 December 2018, Piaggio Aerospace was admitted into receivership after having declared itself insolvent. The company's restructuring plan had failed less than a year after its owner, Mubadala, had injected €255 million and repurchased its bank debt. During February 2020, it was announced that Piaggio Aerospace had been put up for sale.

Operations

Facilities

Piaggio Aero Industries has production facilities covering 120,000 square meters (1.3 million square feet) in the northwest Italian cities of Genoa Sestri and Finale Ligure, as well as a High Technology Center based in Pozzuoli, near Naples. The final aircraft assembly and flight testing of aircraft is located at main facility in Genoa, which includes the corporate headquarters. Also located here is the Company's new JAR 145 certified service center, which offers full service and support to Piaggio P.180 Avanti customers as well as other aircraft. Piaggio Aero also operates two additional service centers, one at Rome's Ciampino Airport and the other at the Pratica di Mare Air Base. These service centers provide support services to commercial, government and military customers.

Aircraft and engine component manufacturing operations, general engineering, and engine maintenance and overhaul are all undertaken at Finale Ligure. Operations include a maintenance center and two production areas, one for engines and sheet metal parts, another for major aircraft sub-assemblies and aero structures. The High Technology Center is located in the Campania region of Italy, near Naples, focuses on aero structure design and systems research. It includes the Piaggio High Technology (PHT) division, a corporate research facility which focuses on aeronautical technologies. The PHT division is a joint partnership between Piaggio Aero Industries, the Italian Aerospace Research Centre (CIRA), and other European research centers. The goal is to establish the PHT as a Center of Excellence for aeronautic research and development.

During the 2010s, Piaggio Aero constructed a new modern manufacturing facility in Villanova d'Albenga, about 70 kilometers west of Genoa. Designed around the principles of lean manufacturing technologies, this plant enabled increases in production efficiency via an optimised workflow, as well as production capacity.

Piaggio Aero worked on the production of aerostructures on behalf of other companies.

Aero engines
A major portion of Piaggio's work has been in the aero engines sector; the company has claimed to be the only aircraft manufacturer that also builds and maintains aero engines. It has been involved in component manufacture, as well as maintenance, repair and overhaul operations on jet, turboshaft and turboprop engines, from various international major manufacturers, including Rolls-Royce and Honeywell. Piaggio has also held Long Term Agreements with several Original Equipment Manufacturers (OEMs), including Pratt & Whitney, Pratt & Whitney Canada and Micro Turbo, whose engines power a wide range of civil and military aircraft and helicopters.

In 2000, Piaggio Aero Industries signed a collaboration agreement with Rolls-Royce to join the RTM322 turboshaft engine program as a manufacturing partner. Accordingly, the company has been involved in the manufacture of a significant share of the RTM322 engine components. During 2003, the company was selected by Pratt & Whitney to supply the Low Pressure Turbine case and the bearing compartment housings for the F135 engine that powers the Lockheed Martin F-35 Lightning II fighter aircraft.

In 2006, Piaggio Aero Industries signed an agreement with Pratt & Whitney Canada to acquire 25% of the share capital of P&WC Turbo Engines Corp., which is in charge of the production of the PW206 – PW207 helicopter engines which fits out many helicopter models such as the Agusta A109 Power', the Eurocopter EC135, the Bell 427, the MD Helicopters MD Explorer and the Kazan Ansat. Piaggio Aero has produced engine components and housed the final assembly line, as well as the maintenance and repair activities for the Pw206-207 engines.

Piaggio Aero Industries also has experience in the area of infrared suppression systems (IRS) for helicopters; the Agusta A129, part of the Italian Army fleet, is currently equipped with an IRS, designed, tested and manufactured by the company.

Aircraft models
 Piaggio FN.305A two-seat training variant of the Nardi FN.305 fighter
 Piaggio P.2 (single-engine low-wing single-seat monoplane fighter prototype)
 Piaggio P.3 (four-engine biplane night bomber prototype)
 Piaggio P.6 (reconnaissance floatplane)
 Piaggio P.7 (high-wing racing monoplane for the 1929 Schneider Trophy seaplane race; unflown)
 Piaggio P.8 (single-engine parasol wing single-seat reconnaissance floatplane)
 Piaggio P.9 (single-engine high-wing two-seat monoplane)
 Piaggio P.10 (single-engine three-seat biplane floatplane)
 Piaggio P.11 (single-engine single-seat lightweight biplane fighter; licensed copy of the Blackburn Lincock)
 Piaggio P.12 (twin-engine four-seat touring monoplane; licensed copy of the Blackburn Segrave)
 Piaggio P.16 (three-engine heavy bomber)
 Piaggio P.23M (four-engine commercial transport prototype)
 Piaggio P.23R (three-engine commercial transport prototype)
 Piaggio P.32 (twin-engine bomber)
 Piaggio P.50 (four-engine heavy bomber)
 Piaggio P.108 (four-engine heavy bomber)
 Piaggio P.111 (high-altitude research aircraft)
 Piaggio P.119 (single-engine single-seat fighter)
 Piaggio P.136 (amphibian flying boat)
 Piaggio P.148 (two-seat primary/aerobatic trainer)
 Piaggio P.149 (four/five-seat utility/liaison or two-seat trainer, also known as Focke-Wulf FWP-149D)
 Piaggio P.150 (two-seat trainer)
 Piaggio P.166 (utility light transport)
 Piaggio P.180 Avanti : business aircraft
 Piaggio PD-808 (twin-jet light utility transport)
 Piaggio P1XX (under development)

References

External links

 Official website
 Mubadala Development Companay

 
Aircraft manufacturers of Italy
Defence companies of Italy
Manufacturing companies based in Genoa
Vehicle manufacturing companies established in 1923
Italian companies established in 1923
Aircraft engine manufacturers of Italy
Engine manufacturers of Italy
Gas turbine manufacturers